Manganese acetate can refer to:

Manganese(II) acetate
Manganese(III) acetate